Fares Mohamed Dessouky (born September 29, 1994 in Alexandria) is a professional squash player who represented Egypt. He reached a career-high world ranking of World No. 11 in March 2017.

He made his first big splash on the PSA World Series during the 2014 British Open where he reached the quarter-finals. He beat Karim Abdel Gawad 3-2 in the first round, Karim Darwish 3-2 in the second round and lost out to Nick Matthew 0-3 in the quarter-final match.

He won his first major PSA title in December 2020 at the CIB Black Ball Open in Egypt defeating Ali Farag in five games.

References

External links 

Egyptian male squash players
Living people
1994 births
21st-century Egyptian people